Robert Doherty may refer to:

Bob Doherty (born 1891), Irish hurler
Robert E. Doherty (1885–1950), American president of Carnegie Mellon University
Robert Doherty (rugby league) (1870–1942), English rugby player
Robbie Doherty (born 1988), Canadian curler
Robert J. Doherty (born 1924), American photographer, scholar, and museum professional

See also
 Lieutenant Bobby Dougherty, a character played by James Gandolfini in Crimson Tide (1995)